Mandy Gonzalez (born August 22, 1978) is an American actress and singer, best known for her leading roles on Broadway. She originated the role of Nina Rosario in the Off-Broadway and Broadway productions of the musical In the Heights. In 2010 and 2011, she played Elphaba in the Broadway production of Wicked. She also portrayed the role of Angelica Schuyler in the Broadway production of Hamilton for a six-year run, from 2016 to 2022.

Early life and education
Gonzalez was born and raised in Santa Clarita, California. Her father is Mexican and her mother is Jewish (of Polish and Romanian origin). She attended Saugus High School and then attended the California Institute of the Arts for one year. Gonzalez then worked as a background singer for Bette Midler's Millennium Tour (1999–2000). After that she moved to New York City, where she worked as a coat check attendant while attending open calls.

Theatre career 
Prior to her appearances on Broadway, Gonzalez appeared in the off-Broadway production of Eli's Comin, a musical which was based on the lyrics and music of songwriter Laura Nyro that ran off-Broadway in 2001. Gonzalez won an Obie Award for her performance.

In 2001, Gonzalez made her debut on Broadway in the role of Princess Amneris in the Tim Rice/Elton John musical Aida as the standby for Idina Menzel. In 2002, she played the role of Sarah in the short-lived Broadway musical Dance of the Vampires. She returned to Aida in 2003, as Amneris, opposite Toni Braxton and Will Chase.

In 2005, Gonzalez appeared in the Broadway musical Lennon, based on the life of John Lennon and Yoko Ono, She played multiple roles, including Lennon himself. The show played a limited 91 performances on Broadway.

Gonzalez then starred as Nina Rosario in the original Broadway cast of In the Heights. Gonzalez created the role of Nina in the show's Off-Broadway production and received a Drama Desk Award for her portrayal.

Gonzalez had previously been offered the role of Elphaba on the first national tour of Wicked, which she would have taken over from Shoshana Bean in January 2007; instead, she declined in order to star in In the Heights, with the role of Elphaba going instead to Victoria Matlock. In 2010, the opportunity finally arose for her to play Elphaba in the Broadway production of Wicked. She replaced Dee Roscioli on March 23, 2010. Not long into her run as the green witch, she won the 2010 Broadway.com Audience Award for Best Female Replacement. On January 30, 2011, she gave her final performance in the role, after which she was replaced by Teal Wicks. Gonzalez also had previously appeared in the ensemble in one of the musical's first readings.

In September 2016, Gonzalez joined the Broadway cast of Hamilton as Angelica Schuyler Church, replacing Renée Elise Goldsberry.

In April 2019, Gonzalez appeared in the John F. Kennedy Center's production of The Who's Tommy as Mrs. Walker. The production, being part of their Broadway Center Stage series, ran a limited run roughly a week long.

Film and television 
Gonzalez appeared on television in The Good Wife, Third Watch, Guiding Light, and Madam Secretary. Her films include Across the Universe (directed by Julie Taymor) and Pieter Gaspersz' After.

In 2016, Gonzalez starred in the ABC thriller Quantico playing the recurring role of Agent Susan Coombs.

In 2021, Gonzalez had a guest appearance in season 1, episode 6 of the Hulu original series Only Murders in the Building, playing the character Mabel Mora's mother, Silvia.

Recording career 
Gonzalez can be heard on the original Broadway cast recording of In the Heights and in the Disney animated film Mulan II as the singing voice of Su.

She released her first solo album, Fearless, on October 20, 2017. The title song was written by Lin-Manuel Miranda, creator and star of In the Heights and Hamilton. The song "Fearless" tells the story of how her parents fell in love as pen-pals during the Vietnam War, and of the #FearlessSquad. The album's seven tracks also include songs written by Bill Sherman, Jennifer Nettles, and Tom Kitt. It includes an acoustic version of her signature In The Heights song "Breathe", a remake of the classic song "Que Sera, Sera", and "Life Is Sweet", a duet with Christopher Jackson, her In the Heights and Hamilton co-star and longtime friend.

Gonzalez debuted her solo show, also titled Fearless, at the Cafe Carlyle for two weeks from October 24 to November 4, 2017. She performed songs from her album as well as many others. Many of her In the Heights friends visited onstage, such as Karen Olivo, Janet Dacal, Priscilla Lopez and Lin-Manuel Miranda. Christopher Jackson joined her as an opening night surprise; he joined her on her final show as well.

Theatre credits

Notes

References
 Mandy Gonzalez Will Fly Into Wicked in March
 Mandy Gonzalez Joins WICKED on Broadway as Elphaba Mar. 23!
 Articles from the Daily News
 Wicked's Mandy Gonzalez Is 'That Girl' With Broadway.com Audience Award Win

External links
 
 

American stage actresses
American musical theatre actresses
Living people
Drama Desk Award winners
American actresses of Mexican descent
American musicians of Mexican descent
American people of Polish-Jewish descent
American people of Romanian-Jewish descent
Hispanic and Latino American actresses
Hispanic and Latino American musicians
Jewish American actresses
People from Saugus, Santa Clarita, California
1978 births
Hispanic and Latino American women singers
21st-century American Jews
21st-century American women
Jewish singers